Cirque Lake is located in Grand Teton National Park, in the U. S. state of Wyoming.

Description
Cirque Lake is just east of Cleaver and Maidenform Peaks in the western sections of Moran Canyon. One of the largest alpine lakes in the Teton backcountry, access to the lake is difficult as there are no maintained trails and bushwacking is required to access it either from Moran Canyon or by ascending a ridgeline from Leigh Canyon and dropping downslope to the lake. For climbers wishing to ascend either Cleaver or Maidenform Peaks, the west side of Cirque Lake provides the easiest access to commence a climb.

References

Lakes of Grand Teton National Park